Demnia is a village in Ternopil Raion of Ternopil Oblast, Ukraine. It belongs to Naraiv rural hromada, one of the hromadas of Ukraine. 

Until 18 July 2020, Demnia belonged to Berezhany Raion. The raion was abolished in July 2020 as part of the administrative reform of Ukraine, which reduced the number of raions of Ternopil Oblast to three. The area of Berezhany Raion was merged into Ternopil Raion.

Population
Population in 2003: 128 inhabitants with over 38 houses.

References

Sources

External links
Official data about the village   

Villages in Ternopil Raion